The 2022–23 Süper Lig, officially called the Spor Toto Süper Lig 2022–23 season, is the 65th season of the Süper Lig, the highest tier football league of Turkey.

Teams
A total of 19 teams contest the league, including 16 sides from the 2021–22 season and 2021–22 TFF First League champions Ankaragücü, runner-ups Ümraniyespor and play-off winners İstanbulspor. Ankaragücü immediately returned to top level, Ümraniyespor is competing in the Süper Lig for the first time in their history. İstanbulspor returned to top level after 17 years.
The bottom four teams will be relegated to the 2023–24 TFF First League.

Stadiums and locations

Personnel and sponsorship

Managerial changes

League table

Results

Number of teams by region

Statistics

Top scorers

Top assists

Clean sheets

Hat-tricks

4 Player scored four goals

References

External links

 

Turkey
1
Süper Lig seasons
Turkey